Yusuf Hussain (21 January 1948 – 30 October 2021) was an Indian television actor known for his work predominantly in Bollywood. Yusuf was also known for his work in Dhoom 2, OMG – Oh My God!, Raees Dil Chahta Hai and Krrish 3. Yusuf was the father of Safeena Husain and father in Law to Hansal Mehta. He died of COVID-19 at the age of 73.

Filmography

References

2021 deaths
Indian actors
Indian male film actors
Male actors in Hindi cinema
People from Punjab, Pakistan
Deaths from the COVID-19 pandemic in India
1948 births